A syndemic or synergistic epidemic is the aggregation of two or more concurrent or sequential epidemics or disease clusters in a population with biological interactions, which exacerbate the prognosis and burden of disease. The term was developed by Merrill Singer in the early 1990s to call attention to the synergistic nature of the health and social problems facing the poor and underserved. Syndemics develop under health disparity, caused by poverty, stress, or structural violence and are studied by epidemiologists and medical anthropologists concerned with public health, community health and the effects of social conditions on health.

The syndemic approach departs from the biomedical approach to diseases to diagnostically isolate, study, and treat diseases as distinct entities separate from other diseases and independent of social contexts.

Definition
A syndemic is a synergistic epidemic. The term was developed by Merrill Singer in the mid-1990s, culminating in a 2009 textbook. Disease concentration, disease interaction, and their underlying social forces are the core concepts.
Disease co-occurrence, with or without interactions, is known as comorbidity and coinfection. The difference between "comorbid" and "syndemic" is per Mustanski et al. "comorbidity research tends to focus on the nosological issues of boundaries and overlap of diagnoses, while syndemic research focuses on communities experiencing co-occurring epidemics that additively increase negative health consequences." It is possible for two afflictions to be comorbid, but not syndemic i.e., the disorders are not epidemic in the studied population, or their co-occurrence is not accompanied by worsened health. Two or more diseases can be comorbid without interactions, or interaction occurs but it is beneficial, not deleterious. Syndemic theory seeks to draw attention to and provide a framework for the analysis of adverse disease interactions, including their causes and consequences for human life and well-being.

Types of disease interaction
Diseases regularly interact and this interaction influences disease course, expression, severity, transmission, and diffusion. Interaction among diseases may be both indirect (changes caused by one disease that facilitate another through an intermediary) and direct (diseases act in direct tandem).
 One disease can assist the physical transmission of the microbe causing another disease, for example, genital-tract ulceration caused by syphilis allowing sexual transmission of HIV.
 One disease may enhance the virulence of another, as for example, herpes simplex virus co-infection exacerbates HIV infection with progression to AIDS,  periodontal bacteria may enhance the virulence of herpesvirus, HIV-infected individuals are more susceptible to tuberculosis; As of 2011, the cause was not fully understood.
 Changes in biochemistry or damage to organ systems, as for example diabetes weakening the immune system, promotes the progression of another disease, SARS.
 A coinfection may open up multiple syndemic pathways. Lethal synergism between influenza virus and pneumococcus, causes excess mortality from secondary bacterial pneumonia during influenza epidemics. Influenza virus alters the lungs in ways that increase the adherence, invasion and induction of disease by pneumococcus, alters the immune response with weakened ability to clear pneumococcus or, alternately amplifying the inflammatory cascade.
 Direct interaction of diseases occurs in the case of genetic recombination among different pathogens, for instance between Avian sarcoma leukosis virus and Marek's disease virus (MDV) in domestic fowl. Both cancer-causing viruses are known to infect the same poultry flock, the same chicken, and, even the same anatomic cell. In coinfected cells, the retroviral DNA of the avian leukosis virus can integrate into the MDV genome, producing altered biological properties compared to those of the parental MDV. The frequency of gene reassortment among human pathogens is less clear than it is the among plant or animal species but of concern as animal diseases adapt to human hosts and as man new diseases comes into contact.
 When one disease diminishes or eradicates another it is a counter-syndemic disease interaction.
 The linkage also may not be clear, despite apparent syndemic interactions among diseases, as for example in type 2 diabetes mellitus and hepatitis C virus infection.

Iatrogenic
The term iatrogenesis refers to adverse effects on health caused by medical treatment. This is possible if medical treatment or medical research creates conditions that increase the likelihood that two or more diseases come together in a population. For example, if gene splicing  unites two pathogenic agents and the resulting novel organism infects a population. One study suggests the possibility of iatriogenic syndemics. During a randomized, double-blind clinical trial testing the efficacy of the prototype HIV vaccine called V520 there appeared to be an increased risk for HIV infection among the vaccinated participants. Notably, participants immune to the common cold virus adenovirus type 5 had a higher risk of HIV infection. The vaccine was created using a replication-defective version of Ad5 as a carrier, or delivery vector, for three synthetically produced HIV genes. On November 6, 2007, Merck & Co. announced that research had been stopped suspecting the higher rate of HIV infection among individuals in the vaccinated was because the vaccine lowered defenses against HIV.

Examples
Various syndemics though not always labeled as such have been described in the literature, including:
 SAVA syndemic (substance abuse, violence and AIDS,
 the hookworm, malaria and HIV/AIDS syndemic,
 the Chagas disease, rheumatic heart disease and congestive heart failure syndemic,
 the possible asthma and infectious disease syndemic,
 the malnutrition and depression syndemic,
 the TB, HIV and violence syndemic,
 the whooping cough, influenza, tuberculosis syndemic, 
 the HIV incidence, substance use, mental health, childhood sexual abuse,  and intimate partner violence syndemics
 the HIV and STD syndemic,
 the stress and obesity syndemic,
 the HIV infection, mental health and substance abuse syndemic.
 the built environment, physical inactivity and obesity/diabetes syndemic, which Prince Charles pointed out in January 2006, in a speech at the Enhancing the Healing Environment conference hosted by The Prince's Foundation for the Built Environment and The King's Fund, St James's Palace, London.
 HIV infection and opportunistic microbial infections and viral-caused malignancies like Kaposi's sarcoma 
 periodontitis and herpes virus: bacteria of several different species (e.g., Porphyromonas gingivalis, Dialister pneumosintes, Prevotella intermedia) that adhere to and reproduce on tooth surfaces under the gum line multiply when bodily defenses are weakened by an HSV infection of the periodontium.
 HIV being transiently suppressed during an acute measles infection. Several potential mechanisms could be responsible. Measles virus infection causes lymphopenia, a reduction in the number of CD4+ T lymphocytes circulating in the blood. The low point occurs just prior to the onset of the characteristic skin rash. Within a month of this nadir, the number of lymphocytes returns to normal levels. The drop in HIV virus levels may be due to a lack of target CD4+ T cells in which they replicate, or measles virus may stimulate the production of proteins suppressing HIV replication, including the β-chemokines, CD8+ cell noncytotoxic anti-HIV response, and the cytokines IL-10 and IL-16. median plasma levels of RANTES, a chemokine that attracts immune system components like eosinophils, monocytes, and lymphocytes were higher in HIV-infected children with measles than in those without measles (Moss and co-workers).
 HIV suppression in tsutsugamuchi disease or scrub typhus, a mite-borne infection in Asia and Australia, but how this occurs is unclear.
 COVID-19 is a syndemic of SARS‑CoV‑2 coronavirus infection combined with an epidemic of non-communicable diseases, both inter-acting on a social substrate of poverty and inequality, according to Richard Horton in the Lancet Global Burden of Disease study 2020 (GBD 2020).

19th century Native American
Contact between Native Americans and Europeans during the Columbian Exchange led to lethal syndemics within the Native American population due to diseases introduced which the Native Americans had not encountered before and had not built-up immunity to.

An example of a syndemic from the 19th century can be found on the reservations on which Native Americans were confined with the closing of the U.S. frontier. It is estimated that in 1860 there were well over 10 million bison living on the American Plains. By the early 1880s, the last of the great herds of bison upon which Plains Indian peoples like the Sioux were dependent as a food source were gone.  At the same time, after the U.S. military's defeat at the Battle of the Little Bighorn in 1876, there was a concerted effort to beat the Sioux into total submission. Thus, in 1872, Secretary of the Interior Columbus Delano stated: "as they become convinced that they can no longer rely upon the supply of game for their support, they will return to the more reliable source of subsistence [i.e., farming]." As a result, they were forced to give up their struggle for an independent existence on their own lands and take up reservation life at the mercy of government authority.  Treaties that were signed with the Sioux in 1868 and 1876 stipulated that they would be provided with government annuities and provisions in payment for sections of their land and with the expectation among federal representatives that the Sioux would become farmers on individually held plots of land. The Sioux found themselves confined on a series of small reservations where they were treated as a conquered people. Moreover, the government reneged on its promises, food was insufficient and of low quality. Black Elk, a noted Sioux folk healer, told his biographer: "There was hunger among my people before I went across the big water [to Europe in 1886], because the Wasichus [whites] did not give us all the food they promised in the Black Hills treaty...  But it was worse when I came back [1889]. My people looked pitiful…  We could not eat lies and there was nothing we could do."  Under extremely stressful conditions, with inadequate diets, and as victims of overt racism on the part of the registration agents appointed to oversee Indian reserves, the Sioux confronted infectious disease from contact with whites. knowledge about the epidemiology of the Sioux from this period is limited, James Mooney, an anthropologist and representative of the Bureau of Indian Affairs sent to investigate a possible Sioux rebellion, described the health situation on the reservation in 1896: "In 1888 their cattle had been diminished by disease.  In 1889, their crops were a failure ...  Thus followed epidemics of measles, grippe [influenza], and whooping cough Pertussis, in rapid succession and with terrible fatal results…"  Similarly, the Handbook of American Indians notes, "The least hopeful conditions in this respect prevail among the Dakota [Sioux] and other tribes of the colder northern regions, where pulmonary tuberculosis and scrofula are very common…  Other more common diseases, are various forms of, bronchitis ...pneumonia, pleurisy, and measles in the young. Whooping cough is also met with."  Indian children were removed to white boarding schools and diagnosed with a wide range of diseases, including tuberculosis, trachoma, measles, smallpox, whooping cough, influenza, and pneumonia.

The Sioux were victims of a syndemic of interacting infectious diseases including the 1889–1890 flu pandemic, inadequate diet, and stressful and extremely disheartening life conditions, including outright brutalization with events like the massacre at Wounded Knee in 1890 and the murder of their leader Sitting Bull. While the official mortality rate on the reservation was between one and two percent, the death rate was probably closer to 10 percent.

Influenza
There were three influenza pandemics during the 20th century that caused widespread illness, mortality, social disruption, and significant economic losses.  These occurred in 1918, 1957, and 1968. In each case, mortality rates were determined primarily by five factors: the number of people who became infected, the virulence of the virus causing the pandemic, the speed of global spread, the underlying features and vulnerabilities of the most affected populations, and the effectiveness and timeliness of the prevention and treatment measures that were implemented.

The 1957 pandemic was caused by the Asian influenza virus (known as the H2N2 strain), a novel influenza variety to which humans had not yet developed immunities. The death toll of the 1957 pandemic is estimated to have been around two million globally, with approximately 70,000 deaths in the United States.  A little over a decade later, the comparatively mild Hong Kong influenza pandemic erupted due to the spread of a virus strain (H3N2) that genetically was related to the more deadly form seen in 1957.  The pandemic was responsible for about one million deaths around the world, almost 34,000 of which were in the United States.  In both of these pandemics, death may not have been due only to the primary viral infection, but also to secondary bacterial infections among influenza patients; in short, they were caused by a viral/bacterial syndemic (but see Chatterjee 2007).

The worst of the 20th-century influenza pandemics was the 1918 pandemic, where between 20 and 40 percent of the world's population became ill and between 40 and 100 million people died.  More people died of the so-called Spanish flu (caused by the H1N1 viral strain) pandemic in the single year of 1918 than during all four-years of the Black Death. The pandemic had devastating effects as disease spread along trade and shipping routes and other corridors of human movement until it had circled the globe. In India, the mortality rate reached 50 per 1,000 population. Arriving during the closing phase of World War I, the pandemic impacted mobilized national armies. Half of U.S. soldiers who died in the "Great War," for example, were victims of influenza. It is estimated that almost  of a million Americans died during the pandemic. In part, the death toll during the pandemic was caused by viral pneumonia characterized by extensive bleeding in the lungs resulting in suffocation.  Many victims died within 48 hours of the appearance of the first symptom.  It was not uncommon for people who appeared to be quite healthy in the morning to have died by sunset. Among those who survived the first several days, however, many died of secondary bacterial pneumonia. It has been argued that countless numbers of those who expired quickly from the disease were co-infected with tuberculosis, which would explain the notable plummet in TB cases after 1918.

Climate change
As a result of the floral changes produced by global warming, an escalation is occurring in global rates of allergies and asthma. Allergic diseases constitute the sixth leading cause of chronic illness in the United States, impacting 17 percent of the population.  Asthma affects about 8 percent of the U.S. population, with rising tendency, especially in low income, ethnic minority neighborhoods in cities. In 1980 asthma affected only about three percent of the U.S. population according to the U.S. CDC.  Asthma among children has been increasing at an even faster pace than among adults, with the percentage of children with asthma going up from 3.6 percent in 1980 to 9 percent in 2005. Among ethnic minority populations, like Puerto Ricans the rate of asthma is 125 percent higher than non-Hispanic white people and 80 percent higher than non-Hispanic black people. The asthma prevalence among American Indians, Alaska Natives and black people is 25 percent higher than in white people.

Air pollution
Increases in asthma rates have occurred despite improvements in air quality produced by the passage and enforcement of clean air legislation, such as the U.S. Clean Air Act of 1963 and the Clean Air Act of 1990. Existing legislation and regulation have not kept pace with changing climatic conditions and their health consequences.  Compounding the problem of air quality is the fact that air-borne pollens have been found to attach themselves to diesel particles from truck or other vehicular exhaust floating in the air, resulting in heightened rates of asthma in areas where busy roads bisect densely populated areas, most notably in poorer inner-city areas.

For every elevation of 10 μg/m3 in particulate matter concentration in the air a six percent increase in cardiopulmonary deaths occurs according to research by the American Cancer Society. Exhaust from the burning of diesel fuel is a complex mixture of vapors, gases, and fine particles, including over 40 known pollutants like nitrogen oxide and known or suspected carcinogenic substances such as benzene, arsenic, and formaldehyde. Exposure to diesel exhaust irritates the eyes, nose, throat and lungs, causing coughs, headaches, light-headedness and nausea, while causing people with allergies to be more susceptible allergy triggers like dust or pollen. Many particles in disease fuel are so tiny they are able to penetrate deep into the lungs when inhaled.  Importantly, diesel fuel particles appear to have even greater immunologic effects in the presence of environmental allergens than they do alone.  "This immunologic evidence may help explain the epidemiologic studies indicating that children living along major trucking thoroughfares are at increased risk for asthmatic and allergic symptoms and are more likely to have respiratory dysfunction." according to Robert Pandya and co-workers.

The damaging effects of diesel fuel pollution go beyond a synergistic role in asthma development. Exposure to a combination of microscopic diesel fuel particles among people with high blood cholesterol (i.e., low-density lipoprotein, LDL or "bad cholesterol") increases the risk for both heart attack and stroke above levels found among those exposed to only one of these health risks.  According to André Nel, Chief of Nanomedicine at the David Geffen School of Medicine at UCLA, "When you add one plus one, it normally totals two... But we found that adding diesel particles to cholesterol fats equals three. Their combination creates a dangerous synergy that wreaks cardiovascular havoc far beyond what's caused by the diesel or cholesterol alone."  Experimentation revealed that the two mechanisms worked in tandem to stimulate genes that promote cell inflammation, a primary risk for hardening and blockage of blood vessels (atherosclerosis ) and, as narrowed arteries collect cholesterol deposits and trigger blood clots, for heart attacks and strokes as well.

Mathematical modelling
A mathematical model is a simplified representation using mathematical language to describe natural, mechanical or social system dynamics. Epidemiological modelers unite several types of information and analytic capacity, including: 1) mathematical equations and computational algorithms; 2) computer technology; 3) epidemiological knowledge about infectious disease dynamics, including information about specific pathogens and disease vectors; and 4) research data on social conditions and human behavior. Mathematical modelling in epidemiology is now being applied to syndemics.

For example, modelling to quantify the syndemic effects of malaria and HIV in sub-Saharan Africa based on research in Kisumu, Kenya researchers found that 5% of HIV infections (or 8,500 cases of HIV since 1980) in Kisumu are the result of the higher HIV infectiousness of malaria-infected HIV patients.  Additionally, their model attributed 10% of adult malaria episodes (or almost one million excess malaria infections since 1980) to the greater susceptibility of HIV infected individuals to malaria.  Their model also suggests that HIV has contributed to the wider geographic spread of malaria in Africa, a process previously thought to be the consequence primarily of global warming.  Modelling offers an enormously useful tool for anticipating future syndemics, including eco-syndemic, based on information about the spread of various diseases across the planet and the consequent co-infections and disease interactions that will result.

PopMod is a longitudinal population tool developed in 2003 that models distinct and possibly interacting diseases. Unlike other life-table population models, PopMod is designed to not assume the statistical independence of the diseases of interest.  The PopMod has several intended purposes, including describing the time evolution of population health for standard demographic purposes (such as estimating healthy life expectancy in a population), and providing a standard measure of effectiveness for health interventions and cost-effectiveness analysis.  PopMod is used as one of the standard tools of the World Health Organization's (WHO) CHOICE (Choosing Interventions that are Cost-Effective) program, an initiative designed to provide national health policymakers in the WHO's 14 epidemiological sub-regions around the world with findings on a range of health intervention costs and effects.

Although in Merrill Singer's conceptual work on syndemics the study of disease interaction is a central issue, most empirically based research studies have not used appropriate statistical models to do so. This problem was highlighted in a 2015 review. The majority (78%) used a statistical model, which provided no information about disease interaction. The methodological and public health consequences of this type of statistical model were further highlighted. While this criticism does not undermine the concept of disease concentration, it highlights a seriously flawed way of syndemics investigations.

Future research

First, there is a need for studies that examine the processes by which syndemics emerge, the specific sets of health and social conditions that foster multiple epidemics in a population and how syndemics function to produce specific kinds of health outcomes in populations. Second, there is a need to better understand processes of interaction between specific diseases with each other and with health-related factors like malnutrition, structural violence, discrimination, stigmatization, and toxic environmental exposure that reflect oppressive social relationships.  There is a need to identify all of the ways, directly and indirectly, that diseases can interact and have, as a result, enhanced impact on human health. Third there is a need for the development of an eco-syndemic understanding of the ways in which global warming contributes to the spread of diseases and new disease interactions.
There is a need for a better understanding of how public health systems and communities can best respond to and limit the health consequences of syndemics. Systems are needed to monitor the emergence of syndemics and to allow early medical and public health responses to lessen their impact. Systematic ethno-epidemiological surveillance with populations subject to multiple social stressors must be one component of such a monitoring system.

See also
 Endemic
 List of epidemics
 List of human diseases associated with infectious pathogens

References

Further reading

Books
 Marshall, Mac 2013 Drinking Smoke: The Tobacco Syndemic in Oceania.  Honolulu, HI: University of Hawai'i Press.
 Mendenhall, Emily 2012  Syndemic Suffering: Social Distress, Depression, and Diabetes among Mexican Immigrant Women. Left Coast Press, Inc.
 Singer, Merrill 2009  Introduction to Syndemics: A Critical Systems Approach to Public and Community Health.  San Francisco, CA: Jossey-Bass.

Articles, chapters

 
 
 Biello, K.B., Colby, D., Closson, E., Mimiaga, M.J., 2014. The syndemic condition of psychosocial problems and HIV risk among male sex workers in Ho Chi Minh City, Vietnam. AIDS Behav 18, 1264–1271. https://doi.org/10.1007/s10461-013-0632-8
 Biello, K.B., Oldenburg, C.E., Safren, S.A., Rosenberger, J.G., Novak, D.S., Mayer, K.H., Mimiaga, M.J., 2016. Multiple syndemic psychosocial factors are associated with reduced engagement in HIV care among a multinational, online sample of HIV-infected MSM in Latin America. AIDS Care 28 Suppl 1, 84–91. https://doi.org/10.1080/09540121.2016.1146205
 Blashill AJ, Bedoya CA, Mayer KH, O'Cleirigh C, Pinkston MM, Remmert JE, Mimiaga MJ, Safren SA. Psychosocial Syndemics are Additively Associated with Worse ART Adherence in HIV-Infected Individuals. AIDS Behav. 2015 Jun;19(6):981-6. doi: 10.1007/s10461-014-0925-6. PMID 25331267; PMCID: PMC4405426.
 
 
 
  http://www.dynamicchiropractic.ca/mpacms/dc_ca/article.php?id=55088&no_paginate=true&p_friendly=true&no_b=true
 
 
 
 
 
 Chu, P., Santos, G.-M., Vu, A., Nieves-Rivera, G., Colfax, J., Grinsdale, S., Huang, S., Phillip, S., Scheer, S. and Aragon, T. 2012 Impact of syndemics on people living with HIV in San Francisco. Presented at the XIX International AIDS Conference, Washington, D.C. (MOACO202 Oral Abstract).
 
 
 
 
 
 
 
 Dyer TV, Turpin RE, Stall R, Khan MR, Nelson LE, Brewer R, Friedman MR, Mimiaga MJ, Cook RL, OʼCleirigh C, Mayer KH. Latent Profile Analysis of a Syndemic of Vulnerability Factors on Incident Sexually Transmitted Infection in a Cohort of Black Men Who Have Sex With Men Only and Black Men Who Have Sex With Men and Women in the HIV Prevention Trials Network 061 Study. Sex Transm Dis. 2020 Sep;47(9):571-579. doi: 10.1097/OLQ.0000000000001208. PMID 32496390; PMCID: PMC7442627
 Easton, Delia 2004 The Urban Poor: Health Issues.  Encyclopedia of Medical Anthropology, Volume 1, pp. 207–13.  New York: Kluwer Academic/Plenum Publishers.
 
 
 
 
 
 
 
 
 
 
 
 
 
 
 
 
 
 Gilbert, Louisa, Primbetova, Sholpan, Nikitin, Danil, Hunt, Timothy, Terlikbayeva, Assel, Momenghalibaf, Azzi, Murodali, Ruziev and El-Bassel, Nabila 2013 Redressing the epidemics of opioid overdose and HIV among people who inject drugs in Central Asia: The need for a syndemic approach. Drug and Alcohol Dependence (in press).
 
 
 
 
 
 
 Guadamuz, Thomas, Friedman, Mark, Marshal, Michael, Herrick, Amy, Lim, Sin How,  Wei, Chongyi, and Stall, Ron 2013 Health, Sexual Health, and Syndemics: Toward a Better Approach to STI and HIV Preventive Interventions for Men Who Have Sex with Men (MSM) in the United States. In S. Aral, K. Fenton, J. Lipshuz, Eds. The New Public Health and STD/HIV Prevention: Personal, Public and Health Systems Approaches.  New York: Springer Sciences and Business Media.
 
 
 
 
 Hein, Casey and Small, Doreen 2007 Combating Diabetes, Obesity, Periodontal Disease and Interrelated Inflammatory Conditions with a Syndemic Approach.
 
 
 Herring, D Ann 2008 Viral Panic, Vulnerability and the Next Pandemic. In Health, Risk and Adversity, Catherine Panter-Brick and Agustín Fuentes, Eds, pp 78–100.  Oxford, U.K.: Berghahn Books, 2008.
 
 
 Himmelgreen, David and Romero-Daza, Nancy. Environment: Science and Policy for Sustainable Development "The Global Food Crisis, HIV/AIDS, and Home Gardens"\. Environment: Science and Policy for Sustainable Development June–July 2010.
 
 Jain S, Oldenburg CE, Mimiaga MJ, Mayer KH. High Levels of Concomitant Behavioral Health Disorders Among Patients Presenting for HIV Non-occupational Post-exposure Prophylaxis at a Boston Community Health Center Between 1997 and 2013. AIDS Behav. 2016 Jul;20(7):1556-63. doi: 10.1007/s10461-015-1021-2. PMID 25689892; PMCID: PMC4540681
 Johnson, C.V., Mimiaga, M.J., White, J.M., Reisner, S.L., Mayer, K.H. Co-occurring psychosocial conditions additively increase risk for unprotected anal sex among MSM at sex parties. Poster presented at the CDC National HIV Prevention Conference, Atlanta, GA, 2011.
 
 
 
 
 
 
 
 
 
 
 
 
 
 
 
 Lim, S.H. Herrick, A., Guadamuz, T., Kao, U., Plankey, M., Ostrow, D., Shoptaw, S. and Stall, R. 2010 Childhood sexual abuse, gay-related victimization, HIV infection and syndemic productions among men who have sex with men (MSM): findings from the Multicenter AIDS Cohort Study (MACS). Presented at the XVIII International AIDS Conference, July 18–23. Vienna, Austria.
 
 Littleton, Juditith and Julia Park 2009 Tuberculosis and syndemics: Implications for Pacific health in New Zealand. Social Science & Medicine (11):1674–80.  doi: 10.1016/j.socscimed.2009.08.042. Epub 2009 Sep 27. PMID 19788951.
 Littleton, Judith, Julie Park, Ann Herring and Tracy Farmer 2008 Multiplying and Dividing Tuberculosis in Canada and Aotearoa New Zealand, Research in Anthropology and Linguistics e3. University of Auckland.
 
 Lyons, Thomas, Johnson, Amy and Garofalo, Robert 2013 "What Could Have Been Different": A Qualitative Study of Syndemic Theory and HIV Prevention Among Young Men Who Have Sex With Men. Journal of HIV/AIDS & Social Services 2013;12(3-4):10.1080/15381501.2013.816211. doi: 10.1080/15381501.2013.816211. PMID 24244112; PMCID: PMC3825850.
 
 Martin, Yolanda 2013 The Syndemics of Removal: Trauma and Substance Abuse. In Outside Justice: Immigration and the Criminalizing Impact of Changing Policy and Practice edited by David Brotherton, Daniel Stageman and Shirley Leyro. New York: Springer, 91–107.
 Mavridis, Agapi 2008 Tuberculosis and Syndemics: Implications for Winnipeg, Manitoba.  In Multiplying and Dividing Tuberculosis in Canada and Aotearoa New Zealand, Judith Littleton, Julie Park, Ann Herring and Tracy Farmer, Eds. Research in Anthropology and Linguistics e3: 43–53.
 
 MacQueen, Kate 2002 Anthropology and Public Health. Encyclopedia of Public Health.  New York: Macmillan Reference.
 McKenzie, Kellye, Mbajah, Joy, Seegers, Angela, and Davis, Celeste 2008 The Landscape of HIV/AIDS among African American Women in the United States. NASTAD National Alliance of State and Territorial AIDS Directors. Issue Brief No. 1:1–12.
 Mercado, Susan, Kirsten Havemann, Keiko Nakamura, Andrew Kiyu, Mojgan Sami, Roby Alampay, Ira Pedrasa, Divine Salvador, Jeerawat Na Thalang, and Tran Le Thuey 2007 Responding to the Health Vulnerabilities of the Urban Poor in the 'New Urban Settings' of Asia. Presented at Improving Urban Population Health Systems, sponsored by the Center for Sustainable Urban Development, July.
 Millstein, Bobby 2001 Introduction to the Syndemics Prevention Network. Atlanta: Centers for Disease Control and Prevention.
 Millstein, Bobby 2004 Syndemics. In: Encyclopedia of Evaluation. Sandra Mathison, Ed. pp. 404–05. Thousand Oaks, CA: Sage Publications.
 Mimiaga, M.J., Biello, K.B., Robertson, A.M., Oldenburg, C.E., Rosenberger, J.G., O'Cleirigh, C., Novak, D.S., Mayer, K.H., Safren, S.A., 2015. High prevalence of multiple syndemic conditions associated with sexual risk behavior and HIV infection among a large sample of Spanish- and Portuguese-speaking men who have sex with men in Latin America. Arch Sex Behav 44, 1869–1878. https://doi.org/10.1007/s10508-015-0488-2
 Mimiaga, M.J., OʼCleirigh, C., Biello, K.B., Robertson, A.M., Safren, S.A., Coates, T.J., Koblin, B.A., Chesney, M.A., Donnell, D.J., Stall, R.D., Mayer, K.H., 2015. The effect of psychosocial syndemic production on 4-year HIV incidence and risk behavior in a large cohort of sexually active men who have sex with men. J. Acquir. Immune Defic. Syndr. 68, 329–336. https://doi.org/10.1097/QAI.0000000000000475
 Mimiaga, M.J., Hughto, J.M.W., Biello, K.B., Santostefano, C.M., Kuhns, L.M., Reisner, S.L., Garofalo, R., 2019. Longitudinal Analysis of Syndemic Psychosocial Problems Predicting HIV Risk Behavior Among a Multicity Prospective Cohort of Sexually Active Young Transgender Women in the United States. J. Acquir. Immune Defic. Syndr. 81, 184–192. https://doi.org/10.1097/QAI.0000000000002009
 Mimiaga, M.J. Hughto, J.M.W., Klasko-Foster, L., Jin, H., Mayer, K.H., Safren, S.A., Biello, K.B. Substance use, mental health problems, and physical and sexual violence additively increase HIV risk between male sex workers and their male clients in Northeastern United States. J Acquir Immune Defic Syndr. 2020 Nov 3. doi: 10.1097/QAI.0000000000002563
 
 
 
 
 
 
 
 Nichter, Mark 2003  "Harm Reduction, Harm Reduction, Ecosocial Epidemiology, Ecosocial Epidemiology, and Syndemics".
 
 Ogunbajo, A., Oke, T., Jin, H., Rashidi, W., Iwuagwu, S., Harper, G.W., Biello, K.B., Mimiaga, M.J., 2020a. A syndemic of psychosocial health problems is associated with increased HIV sexual risk among Nigerian gay, bisexual, and other men who have sex with men (GBMSM). AIDS Care 32, 337–342. https://doi.org/10.1080/09540121.2019.1678722
 
 
 
 
 
 
 
 
 
 
 
 
 
 
 
 
 
 
 Rosenberg, Rhonda and Malow, Robert 2006 Hardness of Risk: Poverty, Women and New Targets for HIV/AIDS Prevention. Psychology & AIDS Exchange 34:3–4, 9, 12.
 Rhodes, Jeselyn 2010 Early Syphilis and HIV Syndemic in Nashville/Davidson Co., Tennessee: Implications for Improving Syphilis Screening for People Living with and at Risk for HIV. Presented at the National STD Prevention Conference. Atlanta, GA.
 
 
 
 Safren, Steven, Blashill, Aaron and O'Cleirigh, Conall 2011 Promoting the Sexual Health of MSM in the Context of Comorbid Mental Health Problems. AIDS and Behavior Supplement 1:S30–34.
 Safren SA, Blashill AJ, Lee JS, O'Cleirigh C, Tomassili J, Biello KB, Mimiaga MJ, Mayer KH. Condom-use self-efficacy as a mediator between syndemics and condomless sex in men who have sex with men (MSM). Health Psychol. 2018 Sep;37(9):820-827. doi: 10.1037/hea0000617. Epub 2018 Jun 21. PMID 29927272; PMCID: PMC6107409
 Sanchez, Melissa, Scheer, Susan, Shallow, Sue, Pipkin, Sharon and Huang, Sandra 2014 Epidemiology of the Viral Hepatitis-HIV Syndemic in San Francisco: A Collaborative Surveillance Approach. Public Health Reports 129(Supplement 1):95-101.
 
 
 Sattenspiel, Lisa and Herring, Ann 2010 Emerging Themes in Anthropology and Epidemiology: Geographic Spread, Evolving Pathogens and Syndemics. In Clark Spencer Larsent, ED. A Companion to Biological Anthropology. Malden, MA: Wiley.
 
 
 Scrimshaw, Neville, Taylor Carl, and Gordon, John 1968 Interactions of Nutrition and Infection.  Geneva: World Health Organization
 
 
 
 
 
 Shields, Sara and Lucy M. Candib,  Eds. 2010 Women-Centered Care in Pregnancy and Childbirth. Oxon, United Kingdom: Radcliffe Publishing Ltd.
 Sibley, Candace Danielle 2011 A Multi-Methodological Study of a Possible Syndemic among Female Adult Film Actresses. MSPH Thesis University of South Florida.
 
 
 
 Singer, Merrill 2004 Critical Medical Anthropology.  In Encyclopedia of Medical Anthropology: Health and Illness in the World's Cultures. Vol. 1:23–30.  Carol Ember and Melvin Ember, (eds). New York: Kluwer.
 Singer, Merrill 2006 Syndemics. Encyclopedia of Epidemiology. Sarah Boslaugh (ed). Thousand Oaks, CA:Sage Publications, Inc.
 
 Singer, Merrill 2008 The Perfect Epidemiological Storm: Food Insecurity, HIV/AIDS and Poverty in Southern Africa.  Anthropology Newsletter (American Anthropological Association) 49(7): 12 & 15 October.
 Singer, Merrill 2008 Drug-related Syndemics and the Risk Environment: Assessing Street risk among Hispanics in Hartford. Presented at the 8th Annual National Hispanic Science Network on Drug Abuse. Bethesda, Maryland.
 Singer, Merrill 2009 Desperate Measures: A Syndemic Approach to the Anthropology of Health in a Violent City. In Global Health in the Time of Violence, Barbara Rylko-Bauer, Linda Whiteford, and Paul Farmer, Editors.  Santa Fe, NM: SAR Press.
 
 
 
 Singer, Merrill 2010 Ecosyndemics: Global Warming and the Coming Plagues of the 21st Century. In Plagues: Models and Metaphors in the Human 'Struggle' with Disease, D. Ann Herring and Alan C. Swedlund, Editors, pp. 21–38.  London: Berg.
 Singer, Merrill 2011 Double Jeopardy: Vulnerable Children and the Possible Global Lead Poisoning/Infectious Disease Syndemic. In Routledge Handbook in Global Health, Richard Parker and Marni Sommer, Editors, pp. 154–61. New York: Routledge.
 Singer, Merrill 2011 The Infectious Disease Syndemics of Crack Cocaine. Journal of Equity in Health (in press).
 
 Singer, Merrill and Baer, Hans 2007 Introducing Medical Anthropology: A Discipline in Action.  AltaMira/ Rowman Littlefield Publishers, Inc.
 
 
 Singer, Merrill, Herring, D. Ann, Littleton, Judith, and Rock, Melanie 2011 Syndemics in Global Health. In A Companion to Medical Anthropology, Merrill Singer and Pamela I. Erickson, Editors, pp. 219–49.  Malden, MA: Wiley-Blackwell.
 
 
 
 
 Specter, Michael 2005 Higher Risk: Crystal Meth, the Internet, and dangerous Choices about AIDS.  The New Yorker, May 23, pp. 39–45.
 Stall, Ron 2007 "An Update on Syndemic Theory Among Urban Gay Men". Presented at the American Public Health Association meetings, Washington, DC. Abstract #155854.
 Stall, Ron, Friedman, M.S., and Catania, J. 2007 Interacting Epidemics and Gay Men's Health: A theory of Syndemic Production among Urban Gay Men. In Unequal Opportunity: Health Disparities Affecting Gay and Bisexual Men in the United States, Richard J. Wolitski, Ron Stall, and Ronald O. Valdiserri (Eds). Oxford: Oxford University Press.
 Stall, Ron, Friedman, M.S., Kurz, M. and Buttram, M.. "2012 Syndemic associations of HIV risk among sex-working MSM in Miami and Ft. Lauderdale, USA". Presented at the XIX International AIDS Conference, Washington, D.C. (MOPE328, Poster exhibit).
 
 Stall, Ron and Mills, Thomas 2006 "Health Disparities, Syndemics and Gay Men's Health". Presented at the Center for Health Intervention and Prevention. University of Connecticut.
 Stall, Ron and van Griensven, Frits 2005 New Directions in Research Regarding Prevention for Positive Individuals: Questions Raised by the Seropositive Urban Men's Intervention Trial. AIDS 19 Supplement 1: S123–27.
 Stephens, Christianne V. 2008  "She was Weakly for a Long time and the Consumption Set" In Using Parish Records to Explore Disease Patterns and Causes of Death In a First Nations Community. Research in Anthropology and Linguistics (RAL-e) Monograph Series. Ann Herring, Judith Littleton, Julie Park and Tracy Farmer (eds.) No. 3 134–48.
 Stephens, Christianne V. 2009 Syndemics, Structural Violence and the Politics of Health: A Critical Biocultural Approach to the Study of Disease and Tuberculosis Mortality in a Parish Population at Walpole Island (1850–1885). In Proceedings of the 39th Annual Algonquian Conference. Vol. 39 581–613. Karl Hele, (ed). London: University of Western Ontario.

External links
 Syndemic Prevention Network: Home
 
 Wayback Machine
 

Epidemics
Influenza pandemics